is a railway station in the city of Tendō, Yamagata, Japan, operated by East Japan Railway Company (JR East).

Lines
Tendō-Minami Station is served by the Ōu Main Line, and is located  rail kilometers from the terminus of the line at Fukushima Station.

Station layout
The station has one side platform serving a single bi-directional track. The station is unattended.

History
Tendō-Minami Station opened on 14 March 2015.

Surrounding area
 Aeon Mall Tendō 
 Lala-Park Tendō
 Yamagata Prefectural General Sports Park
 Yamagata Prefectural General Sports Park Gymnasium
 ND Soft Stadium Yamagata

See also
List of railway stations in Japan

References

External links

 JR East Station information 

Stations of East Japan Railway Company
Railway stations in Yamagata Prefecture
Ōu Main Line
Railway stations in Japan opened in 2015
Tendō, Yamagata